The 2001–02 Scottish League Cup was the 56th staging of the Scotland's second most prestigious football knockout competition, also known for sponsorship reasons as the CIS Insurance Cup.

The competition was won by Rangers, who defeated Ayr United 4–0 in the final.

First round

Second round

Third round

Quarter-finals

Semi-finals

Final

External links
Scottish League Cup 2001/2002

Scottish League Cup seasons
League Cup